"Cold Sweat"/"Maiden, Mother & Crone" is a split single by American bands The Sword and Year Long Disaster. Released as part of the Volcom Entertainment Vinyl Club on March 15, 2010, the single features a cover version of Thin Lizzy's "Cold Sweat" by The Sword and a cover version of The Sword's "Maiden, Mother & Crone" by Year Long Disaster. The single was printed on "opaque baby blue" 7" vinyl and was limited to 1,000 copies.

Track listing

Personnel
"Cold Sweat"
J. D. Cronise – vocals, guitar, production
Kyle Shutt – guitar
Bryan Richie – bass, engineering
Trivett Wingo – drums, backing vocals
"Maiden, Mother & Crone"
Daniel Davies – vocals, guitar
Rich Mullins – bass
Rob Oswald – drums
John Konesky – additional guitar
Scott Reeder – production
Additional personnel
Alexander Von Wieding – artwork

References

2010 singles
The Sword songs
Year Long Disaster songs
Split singles